Coatepeque is a city and municipality in the Santa Ana department of El Salvador.

See also
Coatepeque Caldera

References

External links
 Official website

Municipalities of the Santa Ana Department